Athletes from the Netherlands competed at the Winter Olympic Games for the first time at the 1928 Winter Olympics in St. Moritz, Switzerland.

Bobsleigh

Men

Initially Albert Levy Themans was selected to be part of the team. Due to a heavy strike at his factory, Levy Themans had to withdraw at the last moment. He was replaced by Edwin Teixeira de Mattos.

Speed skating

Men

References

Olympic Winter Games 1928, full results by sports-reference.com

Nations at the 1928 Winter Olympics
1928
Olympics, Winter